Faraj Al-Barasi (could be transliterated as Bor'osi; Borosi; or Barassi; 1960–11 August 1989), was a Libyan footballer who played as a forward. He scored a goal in the 1982 Africa Cup of Nations in Libya.

Al-Barasi died in a road accident on 8 November 1989.

References

1960 births
1989 deaths
Libyan footballers
Association football forwards
Al-Nasr SC (Benghazi) players
Libya international footballers
1982 African Cup of Nations players
Road incident deaths in Libya
Libyan Premier League players